Sir Stephen Townley Holgate,  (born 2 May 1947) is a British physician who specializes in immunopharmacology, respiratory medicine and allergies, and asthma and air pollution, based at the University of Southampton and University Hospital Southampton NHS Foundation Trust, UK.

Education

Holgate was educated at The King's School in Macclesfield until 1965, when he joined Charing Cross Hospital Medical School, London (now incorporated into Imperial College London) where he was awarded BSc and MB BS. After completing postgraduate medical training in London at the National Hospital for Nervous Diseases and the Royal Brompton Hospital, he moved to Salisbury and Southampton where he completed his Specialist higher medical training in General and Respiratory Medicine. 

During his time as a Clinical Lecturer at the University of Southampton, he became concerned with the link between asthma death and over-use of Beta-adrenergic bronchodilator inhalers and undertook research into Beta-Adrenergic Resistance; The development and Mechanisms in normal man, and in 1978, was awarded Doctor of Medicine (MD) degree by the University of London.

Career and research

Holgate's research interests include immunopharmacology, allergy, asthma and pollution. 

In 1980, after completing a 2 year post doctoral fellowship with K Frank Austen at the Robert Brigham Hospital and Harvard University, Boston provided by the Dorothy Temple Cross MRC endowment and the Wellcome Trust he returned to the University of Southampton to pursue a research career in asthma and allied disorders. This was focused on the causes of human asthma and its treatment. After establishing the key role that mast cells and other key effector cells play in triggering the acute allergic inflammatory response in asthma, he pursued the mechanisms of asthma chronicity and variability across the lifecourse. He has utilised many approaches to study asthma including epidemiology, genetics, pathology, microbiology and immunology, pharmacology and experimental medicine. This research has informed guidelines on asthma management and has identified and validated novel therapeutic targets. 

When joined by Donna Davies, a particular focus has been the important role that the epithelium plays in orchestrating both chronic airway inflammation as well as airway wall remodelling. The concept emerged that in severe asthma, the airways behaved like a chronic wound with impaired epithelial repair and underlying tissue remodelling involving the deposition of new matrix, mucous metaplasia and proliferation of smooth muscle. In a collaboration with Genome Therapeutics Corporation in Waltham, Mass, USA, this approach led to the discovery of the first novel asthma susceptibility gene in 2002 of ADAM33 that encodes a metalloprotease linked to airway hyperresponsiveness and remodelling.

Another characteristic feature of asthma is periodic disease exacerbations. Holgate and his research group led by Sebastian Johnston first demonstrated the causal link between exacerbations in the autumn and winter months and respiratory virus infections. This led to the subsequent discovery that epithelial cells from those with moderate-severe asthma were deficient in their ability to generate an innate interferon beta response when infected by human rhinoviruses. This discovery was patented and in 2003 Holgate, Donna Davies and  founded the University spin-off company Synairgen to explore the potential therapeutic benefits of inhaled interferon beta in attenuating virus-induced exacerbations of asthma and COPD. Linked to clinical trials showing antiviral protection in asthma and COPD and the knowledge that SARS CoV-2 has developed mechanisms to evade the innate immune response mechanisms in the lung and that patients with more severe COVID-19 are themselves deficient in being able to mount an interferon beta response, Synairgen has completed a successful Phase II placebo-controlled trial in COVID-19 and is proceeding to undertake larger international trials as a novel treatment for this disease.

Awards and honours

Holgate was appointed Commander of the Order of the British Empire (CBE) in the 2011 New Year Honours and was knighted in the 2020 Birthday Honours for services to medical research.

Other awards include the King Faisal Prize, the Ellison–Cliffe Lecture and the  J. Allyn Taylor International Prize in Medicine.

References

Living people
20th-century British medical doctors
21st-century British medical doctors
Academics of the University of Southampton
Commanders of the Order of the British Empire
Fellows of the Royal College of Physicians
Fellows of the Royal College of Physicians of Edinburgh
Fellows of the Royal College of Pathologists
Knights Bachelor
1947 births
Air pollution in the United Kingdom